Ajith Kumara (born 27 November 1977) is a Sri Lankan former cricketer. He played in 107 first-class and 71 List A matches between 2000/01 and 2013/14. He made his Twenty20 debut on 17 August 2004, for Sri Lanka Air Force Sports Club in the 2004 SLC Twenty20 Tournament.

References

External links
 

1977 births
Living people
Sri Lankan cricketers
Sri Lanka Air Force Sports Club cricketers
Place of birth missing (living people)